Prędocin  is a village in the administrative district of Gmina Skarbimierz, within Brzeg County, Opole Voivodeship, in south-western Poland.

History
The village was mentioned under the Latinized name villa Prendoczino in the Liber fundationis episcopatus Vratislaviensis from ca. 1295–1305, when it was part of fragmented Piast-ruled Poland. Later on, it fell to Bohemia (Czechia), Prussia and Germany. It was reintegrated with Poland in 1945, after the defeat of Germany in World War II.

References

Villages in Brzeg County